Karabük Kardemir Iron-steel Museum is a museum in Karabük, Turkey. Kardemir is the name of the Turkish steel production plant in Karabük. Demir-Çelik in the native name is Turkish for "Iron-Steel"

The museum was established on 14 June 1984 within the Kardemir plant.

Most of the exhibits are about iron works. In the first hall, the images about the construction of the plant in late 1930s, samples of the early production, modern steel construction elements such as angle irons, structural steels, etc. are exhibited. In the second hall there are mockups of steel elements used in engineering such as spare parts of heavy industry, radio and TV transmitter antenna elements, locomotives hoists etc. In the archives section of the museum historical books and images are kept. Although not an archaeology museum, the museum is authorized to control the archaeological finds in the Karabük Province.

References

Buildings and structures in Karabük Province
Museums in Turkey
1984 establishments in Turkey
Tourist attractions in Karabük Province
Museums established in 1984